General Atkinson may refer to:

Anderson W. Atkinson (1923–1992), U.S. Air Force major general
Leonard Atkinson (1910–1990), British Army major general

See also
Attorney General Atkinson (disambiguation)